Mold (or mould) is a structure formed by fungi.

Mold or mould may also refer to:

Artifacts
 Molding (process), in which a hollowed-out block is filled with pliable material
 Mold (cooking implement), a container used to shape food

Biology
 Leaf mold, composted soil or earth, particularly loose soil suitable for planting
 Slime mold, a kind of protist
 Water mold or oomycete, a kind of protist

Entertainment
 Mold (album), Praxis' 1998 experimental music release
 Master Mold, a fictional Marvel Comics villain

People
 Mold (surname)
 Mould (surname)

Places
 Mold, Flintshire, a county town in Wales, UK
 18240 Mould, a main-belt asteroid
 Mold, an unincorporated community of Douglas County, Washington, US

Sports teams
 Mold F.C., a defunct Welsh association football club
 Mold Golf Club, an 18-hole course in Pantymwyn, Wales
 Mold RFC, a rugby union team from Mold, Wales

See also
 Molding (disambiguation)
Molde (disambiguation)
Mulling (disambiguation)
Mull (disambiguation)
Mulled wine, hot spiced alcoholic beverage